Tebogo Makobela (born 14 May 1992) is a South African professional soccer player who plays as a midfielder for Black Leopards.

Career
Born in Giyani, Makobela played for Jomo Cosmos and Chippa United before being released by the latter in summer 2020. In September 2020, Makobela signed for Black Leopards on a three-year deal, but he was suspended by the club for the remainder of the season in April 2021 after taking part in an Easter tournament organised by Thabiso Semenya.

References

External links

Living people
1992 births
Sportspeople from Limpopo
South African soccer players
Association football midfielders
Jomo Cosmos F.C. players
Chippa United F.C. players
Black Leopards F.C. players
South African Premier Division players
National First Division players